Sergey Mikhailovich Brin (born August 21, 1973) is an American business magnate, computer scientist, and internet entrepreneur, who co-founded Google with Larry Page. Brin was the president of Google's parent company, Alphabet Inc., until stepping down from the role on December 3, 2019. He and Page remain at Alphabet as co-founders, controlling shareholders, board members, and employees. As of February 2023, Brin is the 9th-richest person in the world, with an estimated net worth of $89.0 billion.

Brin immigrated to the United States with his family from the Soviet Union at the age of six. He earned his bachelor's degree at the University of Maryland, College Park, following in his father's and grandfather's footsteps by studying mathematics, as well as computer science. After graduation, he enrolled in Stanford University to acquire a PhD in computer science. There he met Page, with whom he built a web search engine. The program became popular at Stanford, and they suspended their PhD studies to start up Google in Susan Wojcicki's garage in Menlo Park.

Early life and education
Brin was born on August 21, 1973, in Moscow in the Soviet Union, to Russian Jewish parents, Mikhail and Eugenia Brin, both graduates of Moscow State University (MSU). His father is a retired mathematics professor at the University of Maryland, and his mother a researcher at NASA's Goddard Space Flight Center.

The Brin family lived in a three-room apartment in central Moscow, which they also shared with Sergey's paternal grandmother. In 1977, after his father returned from a mathematics conference in Warsaw, Poland, Mikhail Brin announced that it was time for the family to emigrate. They formally applied for their exit visa in September 1978, and as a result, his father was "promptly fired". For related reasons, his mother had to leave her job. For the next eight months, without any steady income, they were forced to take on temporary jobs as they waited, afraid their request would be denied as it was for many refuseniks. In May 1979, they were granted their official exit visas and were allowed to leave the country.

The Brin family lived in Vienna and Paris while Mikhail Brin secured a teaching position at the University of Maryland with help from Anatole Katok. During this time, the Brin family received support and assistance from the Hebrew Immigrant Aid Society. They arrived in the United States on October 25, 1979.

Brin attended elementary school at Paint Branch Montessori School in Adelphi, Maryland, but he received further education at home; his father, a professor in the department of mathematics at the University of Maryland, encouraged him to learn mathematics and his family helped him retain his Russian-language skills. He attended Eleanor Roosevelt High School, Maryland. In September 1990, Brin enrolled in the University of Maryland, where he received his Bachelor of Science from the Department of Computer Science in 1993 with honors in computer science and mathematics at the age of 19. In 1993, he interned at Wolfram Research, the developers of Mathematica.

Brin began his graduate study in computer science at Stanford University on a graduate fellowship from the National Science Foundation, receiving a M.S. in computer science in 1995. , he was on leave from his PhD studies at Stanford.

Search engine development
During an orientation for new students at Stanford, he met Larry Page. The two men seemed to disagree on most subjects, but after spending time together they "became intellectual soul-mates and close friends." Brin's focus was on developing data mining systems while Page's was on extending "the concept of inferring the importance of a research paper from its citations in other papers". Together, they authored a paper titled "The Anatomy of a Large-Scale Hypertextual Web Search Engine".

To convert the backlink data gathered by BackRub's web crawler into a measure of importance for a given web page, Brin and Page developed the PageRank algorithm, and realized that it could be used to build a search engine far superior to those existing at the time. The new algorithm relied on a new kind of technology that analyzed the relevance of the backlinks that connected one Web page to another, and allowed the number of links and their rank, to determine the rank of the page. Combining their ideas, they began utilizing Page's dormitory room as a machine laboratory, and extracted spare parts from inexpensive computers to create a device that they used to connect the nascent search engine with Stanford's broadband campus network.

After filling Page's room with equipment, they then converted Brin's dorm room into an office and programming center, where they tested their new search engine designs on the web. The rapid growth of their project caused Stanford's computing infrastructure to experience problems.

Page and Brin used the former's basic HTML programming skills to set up a simple search page for users, as they did not have a web page developer to create anything visually elaborate. They also began using any computer part they could find to assemble the necessary computing power to handle searches by multiple users. As their search engine grew in popularity among Stanford users, it required additional servers to process the queries. In August 1996, the initial version of Google was made available on the Stanford Web site.

By early 1997, the BackRub page described the state as follows:

Some Rough Statistics (from August 29, 1996)
Total indexable HTML urls: 75.2306 Million
Total content downloaded: 207.022 gigabytes
...

BackRub is written in Java and Python and runs on several Sun Ultras and Intel Pentiums running Linux. The primary database is kept on a Sun Ultra series II with 28GB of disk. Scott Hassan and Alan Steremberg have provided a great deal of very talented implementation help. Sergey Brin has also been very involved and deserves many thanks.
- Larry Page 
BackRub already exhibited the rudimentary functions and characteristics of a search engine: a query input was entered and it provided a list of backlinks ranked by importance. Page recalled: "We realized that we had a querying tool. It gave you a good overall ranking of pages and ordering of follow-up pages." Page said that in mid-1998 they finally realized the further potential of their project: "Pretty soon, we had 10,000 searches a day. And we figured, maybe this is really real."

Some compared Page and Brin's vision to the impact of Johannes Gutenberg, the inventor of modern printing:

The comparison was also noted by the authors of The Google Story: "Not since Gutenberg... has any new invention empowered individuals, and transformed access to information, as profoundly as Google." Also, not long after the two "cooked up their new engine for web searches, they began thinking about information that was at the time beyond the web," such as digitizing books and expanding health information.

Other interests
Brin's family office with ex-wife Wojcicki, Bayshore Global Management, oversees over $100 billion in assets and manages his secretive $5 billion charitable foundation.

In June 2008, Brin invested $4.5 million in Space Adventures, the Virginia-based space tourism company.

Brin and Page jointly own a customized Boeing 767-200 and a Dassault/Dornier Alpha Jet, and pay $1.3 million a year to house them and two Gulfstream V jets owned by Google executives at Moffett Federal Airfield. The aircraft have had scientific equipment installed by NASA to allow experimental data to be collected in flight.

Personal life

Brin was raised Jewish, but is not religious.

In May 2007, Brin married biotech analyst and entrepreneur Anne Wojcicki in the Bahamas. They had a son in late 2008 and a daughter in late 2011. In August 2013, it was announced that Brin and his wife were living separately after Brin had an extramarital affair with Google Glass's marketing director Amanda Rosenberg. In June 2015, Brin and Wojcicki finalized their divorce.

On November 7, 2018, he married Nicole Shanahan, a legal tech founder. They have a daughter, born in late 2018. Brin and Shanahan separated on December 15, 2021, and Brin filed for divorce on January 4, 2022. 

Brin's mother, Eugenia, has been diagnosed with Parkinson's disease. In 2008, he decided to make a donation to the University of Maryland School of Medicine, where his mother has received treatment. According to Forbes, Brin has donated over $1 billion to fund research on the disease.

Brin and Wojcicki, although divorced, still jointly run The Brin Wojcicki Foundation. They have donated extensively to The Michael J. Fox Foundation and in 2009 gave $1 million to support the Hebrew Immigrant Aid Society.

Brin is a donor to Democratic Party candidates and organizations, having donated $5,000 to Barack Obama's reelection campaign and $30,800 to the DNC.

According to CNBC, Brin became interested in blockchain technology after building a gaming computer with his son to mine Ethereum.

Awards and accolades

2002–2009
In 2002, Brin, along with Larry Page, was named in the MIT Technology Review TR100, as one of the top 100 innovators in the world under the age of 35.
In 2003, both Brin and Page received an honorary MBA from IE Business School "for embodying the entrepreneurial spirit and lending momentum to the creation of new businesses...".
In 2003, Brin and Page were both Award Recipients and National Finalists for the EY Entrepreneur of the Year Award
In 2004, they received the Marconi Foundation Prize, the "Highest Award in Engineering", and were elected Fellows of the Marconi Foundation at Columbia University. "In announcing their selection, John Jay Iselin, the Foundation's president, congratulated the two men for their invention that has fundamentally changed the way information is retrieved today."
In 2004, Brin received the American Academy of Achievement's Golden Plate Award with Larry Page at a ceremony in Chicago, Illinois.

2009–present
In November 2009, Forbes named Brin and Page the fifth most powerful people in the world.
Earlier that same year, in February, Brin was inducted into the National Academy of Engineering, which is "among the highest professional distinctions accorded to an engineer ... [and] honors those who have made outstanding contributions to engineering research, practice...". He was selected specifically, "for leadership in development of rapid indexing and retrieval of relevant information from the World Wide Web".
In their "Profiles" of Fellows, the National Science Foundation included a number of earlier awards:
As of October 2022, Brin is the 8th-richest person in the world according to Forbes, with an estimated net worth of $83.8 billion.

Appearances in film

References

External links

 Sergey Brin on Forbes
 
 

1973 births
21st-century American inventors
Alphabet Inc. people
American billionaires
American computer businesspeople
American computer programmers
American computer scientists
American people of Russian-Jewish descent
American technology chief executives
American technology company founders
Naturalized citizens of the United States
Business duos
Businesspeople from Maryland
Businesspeople from the San Francisco Bay Area
Businesspeople in information technology
Businesspeople in software
Directors of Alphabet Inc.
Google employees
Internet pioneers
Jewish American philanthropists
Jewish American scientists
Life extensionists
Living people
Members of the United States National Academy of Engineering
People from Greenbelt, Maryland
People from Adelphi, Maryland
Soviet emigrants to the United States
Soviet Jews
Stanford University School of Engineering alumni
University of Maryland, College Park alumni
Web developers
World Economic Forum Young Global Leaders
21st-century American Jews
Centibillionaires